The Lewis Bridge over the Keya Paha River is a historic bridge listed on the National Register of Historic Places in 1992.

The bridge carries a county road over the Keya Paha River, 13.6 miles northeast of Springview, Nebraska, spanning between Keya Paha County, Nebraska and Tripp County, South Dakota.

References

External links 
More photos of the Lewis Bridge (Keya Paha River) at Wikimedia Commons

Bridges completed in 1922
Buildings and structures in Keya Paha County, Nebraska
Buildings and structures in Tripp County, South Dakota
Road bridges on the National Register of Historic Places in Nebraska
Road bridges on the National Register of Historic Places in South Dakota
National Register of Historic Places in Tripp County, South Dakota
Pratt truss bridges in the United States
Metal bridges in the United States
1922 establishments in Nebraska
1922 establishments in South Dakota
Pony truss bridges